Félix Romano, also known as Felice (30 November 1894 – 30 November 1970) was a footballer who played international football for both France and Italy. Born in Buenos Aires, Argentina, he played as a midfielder for Étoile des Deux Lacs, Torino, Reggiana, Genoa and Racing Club de France.

References

1894 births
1970 deaths
Footballers from Buenos Aires
French footballers
France international footballers
Italian footballers
Italy international footballers
Dual internationalists (football)
Torino F.C. players
A.C. Reggiana 1919 players
Genoa C.F.C. players
Racing Club de France Football players
Serie A players
Serie B players
Association football midfielders
Argentine footballers
Argentine expatriate footballers
Argentine expatriate sportspeople in France
Expatriate footballers in France
Argentine expatriate sportspeople in Italy
Expatriate footballers in Italy